Concavus is a genus of barnacles.

Species
, WoRMS recognizes the following two species:
 Concavus concavus (Bronn, 1831) — Pliocene–early Pleistocene; Western Europe.
 Concavus crassostricola Zullo, 1984 — Early Miocene; North Carolina and northern Florida.

Taxonomic history
The genus was circumscribed by William A. Newman in 1982. His original list of subgenera and species for the genus was the following:

 Concavus  genus
  Concavus  subgenus
 C. concavus 
 Menesiniella  subgenus
 C. (M.) aquila 
 C. (M.) regalis 
 Arossia  subgenus
 C. (A.) panamensis 
 C. (A.) p. panamensis 
 C. (A.) p. eyerdami 
 C. (A.) henryae 

Newman noted there were multiple fossil taxa in this genus, but didn't classify any except for the type species C. concavus.

In 1992, Victor A. Zullo revised the genus. He created a new subfamily, Concavinae, with Tamiosoma  (the senior synonym of Menesiniella according to Zullo), Arossia and Concavus among its genera. With his revision, Concavus only consists of the two species C. concavus and C. crassostricola.

Fossil records
This genus is known in the fossil records from the Oligocene to the Quaternary (age range: from 28.4 to 0.012 million years ago). Fossils are found in the marine strata of United States, Italy, Mexico, Morocco, Algeria, France, Haiti, Madagascar, Panama, Colombia and Slovenia.

Notes

References

Barnacles

Aquitanian genus first appearances